Rupert Clement George Carington, 4th Baron Carrington,  (18 December 1852 – 11 November 1929), known as the Hon. Rupert Carington from 1868 to 1928, was a British soldier and Liberal Party politician.

Background
Carington was the third son of Robert Carrington, 2nd Baron Carrington, by his second wife the Hon. Charlotte Augusta Annabella, daughter of Peter Drummond-Burrell, 22nd Baron Willoughby de Eresby, and Lady Sarah Clementina Drummond. Charles Wynn-Carington, 1st Marquess of Lincolnshire, and Sir William Carington were his elder brothers.

Military career
Carington fought in the Anglo-Zulu War of 1879 as a lieutenant in the Grenadier Guards. He volunteered for service again in the Second Boer War, where he was a commanding officer in the 3rd New South Wales Imperial Bushmen. For his service in the war, he was appointed to the Distinguished Service Order (DSO) in 1902.

Political career
Between 1880 and 1885 he sat as Member of Parliament for Buckinghamshire. He was appointed to be a deputy lieutenant of Buckinghamshire in 1887. In 1928, he succeeded as fourth Baron Carrington on the death of his elder brother Lord Lincolnshire.

Family
Carrington married Edith Horsefall, daughter of John Horsefall and Mary Maiden, in 1891. She died in 1908. Carrington survived her by 21 years and died in November 1929, aged 76. He was succeeded in his titles by his son Rupert. Former Foreign Secretary Peter Carington, 6th Baron Carrington, was his grandson.

References

External links 
 
Kidd, Charles, Williamson, David (editors). Debrett's Peerage and Baronetage (1990 edition). New York: St Martin's Press, 1990.

www.thepeerage.com

1852 births
1929 deaths
Liberal Party (UK) MPs for English constituencies
UK MPs 1880–1885
UK MPs who inherited peerages
British Army personnel of the Anglo-Zulu War
Grenadier Guards officers
Commanders of the Royal Victorian Order
Companions of the Distinguished Service Order
Australian military personnel of the Second Boer War
Deputy Lieutenants of Buckinghamshire
Rupert
Rupert 4
Younger sons of barons